KAOW (88.9 MHz FM) is a radio station broadcasting a Christian Talk radio format. It is licensed to Fort Smith, Arkansas, United States, and serves the Fort Smith area.

The station was originally owned by the American Family Association and was an affiliate of American Family Radio. In February 2017, it was announced that the station would be sold to Bott Media's Community Broadcasting, along with KASD, for $460,000. The sale of KAOW and KASD to Community Broadcasting was consummated on May 26, 2017. Both stations joined Bott Radio Network in June.

References

External links
 

Bott Radio Network stations
Radio stations established in 1996
1996 establishments in Arkansas
AOW
Talk radio stations in the United States